Dabar was a župa (county) part of the medieval principality of Zahumlje (later "Hum"). It was first mentioned in the 10th century, in the De Administrando Imperio, as one of five inhabited cities of Zahumlje. It was called Dobriskik. Dabar was situated around the Dabar field (Dabarsko polje), and bordered Dubrava to the west, Nevesinje to the north, Fatnica to the east and Popovo to the south-west. The word dabar means "beaver", thus, the etymology has been connected to beavers. 
There was another region with the same name in the Lim river valley that had been a part of the Serbian kingdom until 1373 when Bosnian Ban Tvrtko I adjoined it to his realm.

References

Sources

Medieval Herzegovina
Župas of the medieval Bosnian state